Raymond Bark-Jones (29 August 1911 – 2 February 1995) was an English rugby union lock who played international rugby for Wales. He played his club rugby for Waterloo R.F.C. and Cambridge University.

Rugby career
Bark-Jones was educated at Uppingham School, Rutland and from there was accepted into Cambridge University. While at Cambridge he played in the 1932 December Varsity match, along with future Wales international Vivian Jenkins. Bark-Jones played impressively and was tipped as a future Welsh cap by the Western Mail and just a few weeks later, in the Welsh trials, was chosen to represent Wales.

Bark-Jones' first international game was a Welsh victory over his birth country, England. Wales had failed to win at Twickenham in the first nine attempts, and the Welsh failure at the ground was known as the 'Twickenham bogey'. Bark-Jones' line-out play was critical to the Welsh victory. The game ended 7-3, with all the Welsh points scored by Ronnie Boon. Bark-Jones played one more international game in the next match of the Home Nations Championship against Scotland at St Helens.

Bark-Jones was injured at the age of 22 and was forced to retire from rugby.
His son Richard Bark Jones continued the rugby tradition at Uppingham, Cambridge and Lancashire. 

His family carry on the Rugby tradition with his great-grand sons Sam Halliwell playing 1st team rugby at Shrewsbury and William Halliwell playing 15 A's Rugby.
A quote from his son Richard Bark- Jones, "he was one of the best rugby players and a great father".
A quote from his son Neville Bark-Jones, "he was gentle off the pitch yet fearful on".

International matches played
Wales
  1933
  1933

Bibliography

References

1911 births
1995 deaths
Cambridge University R.U.F.C. players
English rugby union players
People educated at Uppingham School
People from Crosby, Merseyside
Rugby union locks
Rugby union players from Liverpool
Wales international rugby union players
Waterloo R.F.C. players